Dolicharthria paediusalis is a moth in the family Crambidae. It was described by Francis Walker in 1859. It is found in the Democratic Republic of the Congo, South Africa and Yemen.

References

Moths described in 1859
Spilomelinae
Moths of Africa